St. Xavier's Boys' Academy, Mumbai (abbreviated as SXBA) is a private primary and secondary school for boys located in Marine Lines, Mumbai, Maharashtra, India. The school was established by the Jesuits in June 1957 and caters for students enrolled from Jr Kg through 10. The school is accredited by the Maharashtra State Board of Secondary Education to prepare students for their Secondary School Certificate (SSC) Examination. SXBA accepts boys of all communities, castes, or creeds.

History 
Following are the years and all the events that were newly introduced in SXBA in the past:

 June 1957 - St. Xavier's Boys' Academy school  was established. The founder of this school was Fr. Agnel Sologran SJ and the first principal was Fr. Eudel Palomera
 6 December 1957 - 1st inspection of the academy by Inspector Save                     
 10 December 1957 - 1st picnic to the National park by train 
 22 December 1957 - 1st Christmas party on the terrace of the Academy with fancy dress, games, refreshments, gifts, etc
 5 March 1958 - 1st Annual Sports Day at Brabourne Stadium
 8 and 9 March 1958 - 1st Parents Day Celebrations (then called as the Academy Day)
 4 March 1958 - The Academy's 1st long excursion to Kashmir and North India
 6 August 1958 - The lift starts functioning, but not for the boys
 17 January 1959 - 1st Social Gathering for parents, teachers and students in 3 groups, according to standards
 26 September 1959 - 1st 'Dress As You Like Day' introduced in the school. One day in a month set aside for this
 12 March 1960 - The Academy is recognised as a full-fledged High school for standards 5th to 11th
 29 August 1960 - 1st Medical Inspection in the Academy - strong advice of the doctor,
 23 December 1960 - Standards 9 introduces the Christmas Tableau - moving scenes of the Nativity of Jesus
 4 January 1961 - 1st farewell party of the first batch of S.S.C. students
 5 June 1961 - 1st S.S.C. results received by the Academy. All the students in the English medium were declared successful and in the first grade
 15 July 1961 - Fr. Palomera says, "It is Election Day - for the first time in the Academy, Captains and Vice Captains are elected in a truly democratic manner"
 September 1961 - The Drama and Music club combine to broadcast in All India Radio, the half-hour show on the Wonderland Programme
 11 October 1961 - The Academy joins the Harris Shield Cricket Tournament
 1 September 1962 - 1st quiz for the Higher classes on current events and general knowledge
 20 July 1963 - A Swimming Club started functioning
 1975-1976 - 1st and the last H.S.C. batches of Science and Commerce. Fr. Netto said
 1984 - After the S.S.C. students exams, a batch of S.S.C. students went an adventure led by Pramod Kasliwal and trekked to the Himalayas

Management

Principals 

The following  individuals have served as principals of the Academy:

Managers 
The following individuals have served as managers of the Academy:

School houses 

All students from standards 5th to 10th are assigned into various houses as part of the house system. There are four houses: 
 Kabir house (yellow) - named after - Kabir, a Hindu saint.
 Tagore house (green) - named after - Rabindranath Tagore, an Indian poet, writer and freedom fighter.
 Nehru house (red) - named after - Jawaharlal Nehru, India's 1st prime minister and a freedom fighter.
 Tilak house (blue) - named after - Balgangadhar Tilak, an Indian freedom fighter and a teacher.

The houses are given to boys,  once they reach 5th standard and the house remains the same until the 10th standard.

See also

 List of Jesuit schools
 List of schools in Mumbai
 Violence against Christians in India

References

External links 
https://www.sxba.in
The Academy Boys' Chronicle magazine of the year 2016-17
https://sites.google.com/site/sxbasite/news/may-day

Jesuit secondary schools in India
Jesuit primary schools in India
Boys' schools in India
Christian schools in Maharashtra
High schools and secondary schools in Mumbai
Educational institutions established in 1957
1957 establishments in Bombay State